St. Paul, originally known as St-Paul-de-Métis or St-Paul-des-Métis, is a town in east-central Alberta, Canada that is surrounded by the County of St. Paul No. 19. It was known as St. Paul de(s) Métis between 1912 and 1936.

History 
The community was founded as a Métis colony in 1896 after missionary Albert Lacombe petitioned the Canadian government for a land grant reserved for the Métis people to farm. The colony was founded as Saint-Paul-des-Métis on four townships of federal government property which was leased for 99 years at a rate of $1 per year. Each Métis family which settled in the area received 80 acres of land, livestock, farming equipment and access to collective land, and soon after a chapel, boarding school, sawmill and windmill were constructed in the colony. The colony experienced significant hardships due to storms and a fire in 1905 which resulted in the colony's failure and termination of the government lease in 1908. One of the original structures of the colony, the Old St. Paul Rectory, a mission site built as the administrative centre for the Oblate priests remains standing today, and is designated a Alberta Provincial Historical Resource.

The community would construct a 48 km railroad track to connect the village with the Canadian railway network in 1920, which had stopped at Spedden, Alberta.

Demographics 

In the 2016 Census of Population conducted by Statistics Canada, the Town of St. Paul recorded a population of 5,827 living in 2,248 of its 2,378 total private dwellings, a  change from its 2011 population of 5,405.

As of the 2016 Canada Census, 71% of the population is of European descent. Indigenous people make up the next largest ethnic group with 16% of St. Paul's population. Most of the town's Indigenous residents are Cree or Métis. Visible minorities make up 12.3% of St. Pauls population. Filipino Canadians (6.1%) form the largest group, followed by Black Canadians (3.6%), Chinese (0.7%) and South Asians (0.7%).

Economy 
St. Paul's economy is driven by the agriculture and service industries. St. Paul is located in Alberta's Lakeland tourism district.

Attractions 

St. Paul is home to the world's first UFO landing pad, built as part of the 1967 Canadian Centennial celebrations in an effort to attract both tourists and Martians to the community. The pad consists of a 30-tonne raised platform with a map of Canada embossed on the back stop, consisting of stones provided by each province of Canada. On June 3, 1967, Paul Hellyer, Minister of National Defence, flew in by helicopter to officially open the Pad. The pad was one of over 100 Centennial Projects organized by the town. The idea for the UFO landing pad is credited to former town Mayor Jules Van Brabant and a couple of local business owners, the concrete and steel materials for the landing pad were donated by local construction companies, and a local designer developed the blueprint for the mushroom-shaped pod.

The sign beside the pad reads: "The area under the World's First UFO Landing Pad was designated international by the Town of St. Paul as a symbol of our faith that mankind will maintain the outer universe free from national wars and strife. That future travel in space will be safe for all intergalactic beings, all visitors from earth or otherwise are welcome to this territory and to the Town of St. Paul." Mentioned in George Fox's song, Real Canadian Town. The UFO Landing pad was also featured across Canada as a film crew with Cineplex Entertainment was in the town in May 2014 filming a pre-show piece to be played in Cineplex movie theatres across Canada throughout the month of June. The UFO landing pad was visited by Queen Elizabeth II and Prince Philip during their 1978 tour of Canada, which included stops at the world's largest easter egg in Vegreville and other communities in Eastern Alberta.

Notable people 
Ryley Barnes, former professional volleyball player
Kyle Brodziak, professional hockey player
Alex Janvier, indigenous visual artist
Brett Kissel, professional country singer/songwriter
Wilf Martin, former professional hockey player
Caleb Lawrence McGillvary, convicted murderer known as the "Hatchet-Wielding Hitchiker".
Audrey Poitras, President of the Métis Nation of Alberta
Marcel Rocque, curler
Jamie Sadlowski, former professional long driver and golfer
Stan Smyl, former professional hockey player
Bernard Trottier, politician
Calvin Vollrath, professional fiddler and composer

See also 
List of communities in Alberta
List of towns in Alberta

References

External links 

1912 establishments in Alberta
County of St. Paul No. 19
Métis in Alberta
Saint Paul, Alberta